María del Pilar Peña Sánchez (born 14 July 1973), professionally known as Candela Peña, is a Spanish actress. Since her film debut in the 1994 thriller Running Out of Time, she has had a lengthy career in cinema.  She won the Goya Award for Best Actress for her performance in Princesses (2005) whereas she won the Goya Award for Best Supporting Actress for Take My Eyes (2003) and A Gun in Each Hand (2012).

Biography 
María del Pilar Peña Sánchez (her real name; she took the artistic name of Candela reportedly upon joining the theatre school), was born on 14 July 1973 in Gavà, province of Barcelona, daughter to a mother from Murcia and a father from Lora del Río who had a bar in Barcelona.

When she was four years old she started to learn dance in the city and after finishing high-school she went to Seville to begin theatre classes there and eventually in Madrid.

She made her first television appearance in the TV3 show , making her film debut with a performance in the 1994 thriller Running Out of Time, which earned her two Goya Award nominations (New Actress and Supporting Actress).

Encouraged by Pedro Almodóvar, she published the novel Pérez Príncipe, María Dolores in 2001.

She won the Goya Award in 2003 (for the movie Te doy mis ojos) after being nominated several times previously.

Filmography

Film

Television

Accolades

References

External links
 

Spanish film actresses
Film actresses from Catalonia
Living people
1973 births
Best Actress Goya Award winners
20th-century Spanish actresses
21st-century Spanish actresses